Enteromius rouxi is a species of ray-finned fish in the genus Enteromius which is endemic to the Kouilou-Niari basin in the Republic of the Congo.

Footnotes 

 

Endemic fauna of the Republic of the Congo
Enteromius
Taxa named by Jacques Daget
Fish described in 1961